Napodytes boki is a species of beetle in the family Dytiscidae, the only species in the genus Napodytes.

References

Dytiscidae